In enzymology, a 13-hydroxylupinine O-tigloyltransferase is an enzyme that catalyzes the chemical reaction

(E)-2-methylcrotonoyl-CoA + 13-hydroxylupinine  CoA + 13-(2-methylcrotonoyl)oxylupinine

Thus, the two substrates of this enzyme are (E)-2-methylcrotonoyl-CoA and 13-hydroxylupinine, whereas its two products are CoA and 13-(2-methylcrotonoyl)oxylupinine.

This enzyme belongs to the family of transferases, specifically those acyltransferases transferring groups other than aminoacyl groups.  The systematic name of this enzyme class is (E)-2-methylcrotonoyl-CoA:13-hydroxylupinine O-2-methylcrotonoyltransferase. Other names in common use include tigloyl-CoA:13-hydroxylupanine O-tigloyltransferase, and 13-hydroxylupanine acyltransferase.

References

 

EC 2.3.1
Enzymes of unknown structure